Racibórz  is a village in the administrative district of Gmina Świętajno, within Szczytno County, Warmian-Masurian Voivodeship, in northern Poland. It is located in Masuria.

Sightseeing.
Monument - Pomnik Matki Polki

History
In 1454, the region was incorporated into the Kingdom of Poland by King Casimir IV Jagiellon. Following the Thirteen Years' War (1454–1466), it was part of Poland as a fief, initially held by the Teutonic Knights. From the 18th century it was part of the Kingdom of Prussia, and from 1871 to 1945 it was also part of Germany, before it became again part of Poland following Germany's defeat in World War II.

References

Villages in Szczytno County